John Henry Gardner (30 January 1870 – 5 March 1909) was a New Zealand rugby union player. A loose forward, Gardner has the distinction of being the first player to represent the New Zealand national team before gaining provincial representation. He was a member of the New Zealand team on their 1893 tour of Australia, playing in four matches. He did not win a test cap, as New Zealand did not play its first full international match until 1903. After the tour of Australia, Gardner represented  at a provincial level for two seasons, and captained the side in 1894.

Gardner was born in Timaru on 30 January 1870. In 1896 he took over the licence of the Sportsman's Arms Hotel at Saltwater Creek, just south of Timaru, from his father. The following year Gardner married Margaret Catherine Kennedy, and the couple had three children. In 1908 Gardner moved to Australia. He died in Melbourne Gaol on 5 March 1909 following a heavy drinking session.

References

1870 births
1909 deaths
Rugby union players from Timaru
New Zealand rugby union players
New Zealand international rugby union players
South Canterbury rugby union players
Rugby union flankers
New Zealand hoteliers
New Zealand emigrants to Australia